Juliana Yendork (born 29 August 1972) is a retired Ghanaian American long jumper and triple jumper.

She won the gold medal at the 1988 African Championships. That year she also competed at the 1988 Olympic Games, one month before her 16th birthday to fulfill the dream of her father, Charles who had been denied the opportunity to compete in the 1976 Olympic Games by the hastily called African boycott. Her personal best jump was 6.32 metres, achieved in June 1989 in Schwechat.

She later became an American citizen, and focused on the triple jump, setting a career best of 13.42 metres in May 1991 in Norwalk in the qualification round of the CIF California State Meet while still at Walnut High School.  That mark stood as the National High School Record for ten years.  She won both the Long Jump and Triple Jump at the state meet three years in a row, each time by large margins.  Her freshman year she competed for University High School in Waco, Texas.

She continued competing for UCLA, who also hired her father as their jumps coach but never attained the high level marks of her high school days.  She was inducted into the Mt. SAC Relays Hall of Fame in 1993.

References

External links
California State Records before 2000
Juliana Yendork jumping in high school

1972 births
Living people
Ghanaian female triple jumpers
American female triple jumpers
Ghanaian female long jumpers
American female long jumpers
Olympic athletes of Ghana
Athletes (track and field) at the 1988 Summer Olympics
American sportspeople of Ghanaian descent
UCLA Bruins women's track and field athletes
Track and field athletes from California
African-American female track and field athletes
21st-century African-American sportspeople
21st-century African-American women
20th-century African-American sportspeople
20th-century African-American women